Stilla is a genus of sea snails, marine gastropod mollusks in the family Raphitomidae.

Distribution
This genus occurs off New Zealand.

Species
Species within the genus Stilla include:
 Stilla anomala Powell, 1955
 Stilla delicatula Powell, 1927
 Stilla fiordlandica Fleming C., 1948
 Stilla flexicostata (Suter, 1899)
 Stilla paucicostata Powell, 1937

References

 Bouchet P., Kantor Yu.I., Sysoev A. & Puillandre N. (2011) A new operational classification of the Conoidea. Journal of Molluscan Studies 77: 273-308.

External links
 
 Worldwide Mollusc Species Data Base: Raphitomidae

 
Raphitomidae
Gastropod genera